A tankard is a form of drinkware consisting of a large, roughly cylindrical, drinking cup with a single handle. Tankards are usually made of silver or pewter, but can be made of other materials, for example wood, ceramic, or leather. A tankard may have a hinged lid, and tankards featuring glass bottoms are also fairly common. Tankards are shaped and used similarly to beer steins.

Wooden tankards
The word "tankard" originally meant any wooden vessel (13th century) and later came to mean a drinking vessel. The earliest tankards were made of wooden staves, similar to a barrel, and did not have lids. A 2000-year-old wooden tankard of approximately four-pint capacity has been unearthed in Wales.

Glass bottoms
Metal tankards often come with a glass bottom. The legend is that the glass-bottomed tankard was developed as a way of refusing the King's shilling, i.e., conscription into the British Army or Navy. The drinker could see the coin in the bottom of the glass and refuse the drink, thereby avoiding conscription. However, this is likely a myth since the Navy could press by force, rendering deception unnecessary.

In a bar fight, the first punch was thrown while the recipient had the tankard raised to his mouth; another legend has it that the glass bottom was implemented to see the attack coming.

A further story is that the glass bottom merely allowed the drinker to judge the clarity of their drink while forgoing the expense of a fragile pint glass.

Glass bottoms are sometimes retrofitted to antique tankards, reducing their value and authenticity.

Conversions
Covered tankards fell out of fashion in 19th century England resulting in a number of them being converted to other roles such as jugs.

Modern tankards
Metal and ceramic tankards are still manufactured but are regarded as specialty or novelty items. Modern metal tankards are often engraved to commemorate some occasion.
Glass tankards—that is, straight-sided or inward-sloping glass vessels with strap handles—are still in everyday use.

Lead leaching from pewter
In previous centuries, the pewter used to make tankards often contained lead, which exposed the drinker to medical effects, ranging from heavy metal poisoning to gout. This effect was exacerbated in cider-drinking areas—such as Somerset, UK—as the acidity of the cider leached the lead from the pewter more quickly. Clay tankards became prevalent in this area. Pewter is now widely lead-free.

In popular culture
A 1970s TV advertising campaign for Whitbread beer features a pub landlord spinning a tall tale to an American tourist, who suspiciously asks: "Are you really Lord Tankard?"

Gallery

See also
Beer stein
Häufebecher
Kronkåsa
Maß

References

External links
 An ancient Middle Eastern tankard at the British Museum

Drinkware
Beer vessels and serving

ca:Xop (atuell)
it:Boccale